Polycomb group RING finger protein 6 is a protein that in humans is encoded by the PCGF6 gene.

The protein encoded by this gene contains a RING finger motif, which is most closely related to those of polycomb group (PcG) proteins RNF110/MEL-18 and BMI1. PcG proteins are known to form protein complexes and function as transcription repressors. This protein has been shown to interact with some PcG proteins and act as a transcription repressor. The activity of this protein is found to be regulated by cell cycle dependent phosphorylation. Alternatively spliced transcript variants encoding different isoforms have been identified.

References

Further reading